The Women's 100 metre freestyle competition of the swimming events at the  2015 World Aquatics Championships was held on 6 August with the heats and the semifinals and 7 August with the final.

Records
Prior to the competition, the existing world and championship records were as follows.

Results

Heats
The heats were held at 09:30.

Semifinals
The semifinals were held at 17:32.

Semifinal 1

Semifinal 2

Final
The final was held on 7 August at 17:32.

References

Women's 100 metre freestyle
2015 in women's swimming